Aarne Sihvo (22 November 1889 – 12 June 1963) was a Finnish general and politician.

Biography 
Sihvo was born in Virolahti to a family of school teachers: Antti Adolf Sihvo and Minna Elisabeth o.s. Nyman. He graduated from a high school in 1910 and began studying medicine in the Helsinki University.

In 1915 he moved to Germany where he started his military education. During the Civil war in Soviet Russia in 1918 Aarne commanded the front in Karelia between Saimen and Ladoga Lake. His military operations as a part of Karelian army concluded to holding a position south of Vuoksen. His youth, his background as a hunter and his speaking Finnish made him an alternative to Gustaf Mannerheim. But despite his successful initial career he left the Army in 1918 because he couldn't come to terms with German orientation. He was an adherent of Republic unlike with many advocates of monarсhy of his country. Aarne Sihvo had run as a candidate for parliamentary elections in 1919 as a member of the National Progressive Party and won the majority of votes in his district.

He was a member of the Parliament of Finland from 1919 to 1920, representing the National Progressive Party. He was the Chief of Defence of the Finnish Defence Forces 1926–1933 and 1946–1953. Sihvo was a recipient of the Latvian military Order of Lāčplēsis, 2nd class.

Sihvo died aged 73, in Helsinki. He is buried in the Hietaniemi Cemetery in Helsinki.

References

External links 

 
Finnish Civil War: Aarne Sihvo 
Parliament of Finland: Aarne Sihvo 
The Finnish Defence Forces: Chiefs of Defence

1889 births
1963 deaths
People from Virolahti
People from Viipuri Province (Grand Duchy of Finland)
National Progressive Party (Finland) politicians
Members of the Parliament of Finland (1919–22)
Finnish generals
German military personnel of World War I
People of the Finnish Civil War (White side)
Finnish military personnel of World War II
Recipients of the Order of Lāčplēsis, 2nd class
Burials at Hietaniemi Cemetery